The term  'National Union Government'  is used in Luxembourg to denote either of two different periods in the history of the Grand Duchy.  The National Union Governments were forms of national governments, an instrument used in many countries in times of national emergency or political instability.

1916-7

The first National Union Government took office on 24 February 1916 and left office on 19 June 1917, at the height of the First World War.  The government was led by Victor Thorn, and the government included members of the conservative, liberal, and socialist factions.  At the time, Luxembourg was occupied by the German Empire, but was allowed to maintain its own political affairs.  Regardless, the German army's presence in Luxembourg dominated the political landscape.

The government collapsed after sixteen months.  A growth in electoral support for independent candidates indicated that the coalition did not represent the national consensus.  Furthermore, civil disorder, including strikes by iron miners and the emergence of a flourishing black market in foodstuffs, convinced Thorn that he was not serving his country properly, and he resigned.

1945-7

The second National Union Government took office on 14 November 1945 and left office on 13 February 1947, in the direct aftermath of the Second World War.  The government was led by Pierre Dupong, the leader of the CSV, and included members of all parties in the Chamber of Deputies, in addition to the only independent.

The agenda was dominated by reconstruction and the normalisation of the economy and of society, particularly the creation of a welfare state.  However, the greatest strength of the government, the unanimous support of the legislature, was turned into a weakness.  Ministers became too enthralled by their own briefs, and fundamental policy differences between the four ideologically-disparate parties brought an end to the National Union Government.

See also
Liberation Government (Luxembourg)

Political history of Luxembourg
Coalition governments